Fatoto  is a small town in eastern Gambia on the Gambia River. It is located in Kantora District in the Upper River Division.  As of 2009, it has an estimated population of 
1,685.

A bridge over the Gambia river, funded by the Chinese government, opened in October 2021.

References

Populated places in the Gambia
Upper River Division